Events during the year 1110 in Italy.

Events
 Henry V, Holy Roman Emperor Invades Italy

Deaths
 Richard of Hauteville

Sources
Kleinhenz, Christopher. Medieval Italy: an encyclopedia, Volume 1. Routledge, 2004.
Bryce, James. The Holy Roman Empire. MacMillan, 1913
Comyn, Robert. History of the Western Empire, from its Restoration by Charlemagne to the Accession of Charles V, Vol. I. 1851
Gwatkin, H.M., Whitney, J.P. (ed) et al. The Cambridge Medieval History: Volume III. Cambridge University Press, 1926.
Norwich, John Julius. The Normans in the South 1016–1130. Longmans: London, 1967.
Milman, Henry. History of Latin Christianity, including that of the Popes, to the Pontificate of Nicholas V, Vol. III. 1854
Ghisalberti, Albert (ed). Dizionario Biografico degli Italiani: II Albicante – Ammannati. Rome, 1960.
Gwatkin, H.M., Whitney, J.P. (ed) et al. The Cambridge Medieval History: Volume III. Cambridge University Press, 1926.
Norwich, John Julius. The Normans in the South 1016-1130. Longmans: London, 1967.
Chalandon, Ferdinand. Histoire de la domination normande en Italie et en Sicilie. Paris, 1907.
Gravett, Christopher, and Nicolle, David. The Normans: Warrior Knights and their Castles. Osprey Publishing: Oxford, 2006.
Beech, George. A Norman-Italian Adventurer in the East: Richard of Salerno. 1993.

Years of the 12th century in Italy
Italy
Italy